Warner Bros. Cartoons, Inc. (formerly known as Leon Schlesinger Productions until 1944) was an American animation studio, serving as the in-house animation division of Warner Bros. during the Golden Age of American animation. One of the most successful animation studios in American media history, it was primarily responsible for the Looney Tunes and Merrie Melodies series of animated short films. The characters featured in these cartoons, including Bugs Bunny, Daffy Duck, and Porky Pig, are among the most famous and recognizable characters in the world. Many of the creative staff members at the studio, including directors and animators such as Chuck Jones, Friz Freleng, Robert McKimson, Tex Avery, Robert Clampett, Arthur Davis, and Frank Tashlin, are considered major figures in the art and history of traditional animation.

Warner Bros. Cartoons was founded in 1933 by Leon Schlesinger as Leon Schlesinger Productions. Schlesinger sold the studio to Warner Bros. in 1944, after which the Warner Bros. Cartoons name was adopted. The studio closed in 1963, and Looney Tunes and Merrie Melodies were subsequently subcontracted to Freleng's DePatie–Freleng Enterprises studio from 1964 to 1967. Warner Bros. Cartoons re-opened that year, under Warner Bros.-Seven Arts, before closing again in 1969. It was succeeded by Warner Bros. Animation, which was established in 1980.

History

1930–1933: Harman-Ising Productions 

Hugh Harman and Rudolf Ising originated the Looney Tunes and Merrie Melodies series of animated short subjects in 1930 and 1931, respectively. Both cartoon series were produced for Leon Schlesinger at the Harman-Ising Studio on Hollywood Boulevard in Hollywood, California, with Warner Bros. Pictures releasing the films to theaters. The first Looney Tunes character was the Harman-Ising creation Bosko, The Talk-ink Kid. Despite the fact that Bosko was popular among theater audiences, he could never match the popularity of Walt Disney's Mickey Mouse, or even Max Fleischer's Betty Boop. In 1933, Harman and Ising parted company with Schlesinger over financial disputes, and took Bosko with them to Metro-Goldwyn-Mayer. As a result, Schlesinger set up his own studio on the Warner Bros. lot on Sunset Boulevard in Hollywood.

1933–1944: Leon Schlesinger Productions 
 
The Schlesinger studio got off to a slow start, continuing their one-shot Merrie Melodies and introducing a Bosko replacement named Buddy into the Looney Tunes. Disney animator Tom Palmer was the studio's first senior director, but after the three cartoons he made were deemed to be of unacceptable quality and rejected by the studio, former Harman-Ising animator/musical composer Isadore "Friz" Freleng was called in to replace Palmer and rework his cartoons where every cartoon Freleng directed from 1933 to 1963 was created/directed by Freleng's musical compositions and methods.
 The studio then formed the three-unit structure that it would retain throughout most of its history, with one of the units headed by Ben "Bugs" Hardaway, and the other by Earl Duvall, who was replaced by Jack King a year later.

In 1935, Freleng helmed the Merrie Melodies cartoon I Haven't Got a Hat, which introduced the character Porky Pig. Hardaway and King departed, and a new arrival at Schlesinger's, Fred "Tex" Avery, took Freleng's creation and ran with it. Avery directed a string of cartoons starring Porky Pig that established the character as the studio's first bona fide star. Schlesinger also gradually moved the Merrie Melodies cartoons from black and white, to two-strip Technicolor in 1934, and finally to full three-strip Technicolor in 1935. The Looney Tunes series would be produced in black-and-white for much longer, until 1943.

Because of the limited spacing conditions in the Schlesinger building at 1351 N. Van Ness on the Warner Sunset lot, Avery and his unit – including animators Robert Clampett and Chuck Jones – were moved into a small building elsewhere on the Sunset lot, which Avery and his team affectionately dubbed "Termite Terrace." Although the Avery unit moved out of the building after a year, "Termite Terrace" later became a metonym for the classic Warner Bros. animation department in general, even for years after the building was abandoned, condemned, and torn down. During this period, four cartoons were outsourced to the Ub Iwerks studio; however, Iwerks struggled to adapt his style to the type of humor that the Looney Tunes had developed by this time, and so Clampett took over as director (using Iwerks' staff) for the last two of these outsourced cartoons. Schlesinger was so impressed by Clampett's work on these shorts that he opened a fourth unit for Clampett to head, although for tax reasons this was technically a separate studio headed by Schlesinger's brother-in-law, Ray Katz.

From 1936 until 1944, animation directors and animators such as Freleng, Avery, Clampett, Jones, Arthur Davis, Robert McKimson, and Frank Tashlin worked at the studio. During this period, these creators introduced several of the most popular cartoon characters to date, including Daffy Duck (1937, Porky's Duck Hunt by Avery), Elmer Fudd (1940, Elmer's Candid Camera by Jones), Bugs Bunny (1940, A Wild Hare by Avery), and Tweety (1942, A Tale of Two Kitties by Clampett). Avery left the studio in 1941 following a series of disputes with Schlesinger, who shortly after closed the studio for two weeks due to a minor strike similar to the better known one that occurred at Disney. A few months earlier he banished all unionized employees in what became known in retrospect as the "Looney Tune Lockout"; this time Schlesinger lost nearly all of his employees of the Avery unit. Clampett and several of his key animators took over Avery's former unit, while Clampett's own position as director of the Schlesinger-Katz studio was taken by Norm McCabe, a Clampett animator whose cartoons focused in war-related humor; McCabe, in turn, lasted barely a year before being drafted, and Frank Tashlin returned to the studio to replace him.

By 1942, the Schlesinger studio had surpassed Walt Disney Productions as the most successful producer of animated shorts in the United States. Between 1942 and 1945, the Schelsinger studio produced a number of films for the United States military in support of its efforts in World War II. Under the command of the US Air Force's First Motion Picture Unit, headed from 1942 to 1944 by Major Theodor Seuss Geisel (better known as Dr. Seuss), the studio produced the Private Snafu and (with Walter Lantz Productions) Mr. Hook cartoons for the servicemen's entertainment.

1944–1963: Warner Bros. Cartoons 

On July 1, 1944, Schlesinger sold his studio to Warner Bros. for $700,000, which renamed the company Warner Bros. Cartoons, Inc., and Edward Selzer (who by Jones' and Freleng's accounts had no sense of humor or appreciation of cartoons), was appointed by Warner Bros. as the new head of the cartoon studio after Schlesinger retired. In September 1944 Frank Tashlin left, and in May 1945, Bob Clampett left. Tashlin's unit was initially taken over by Robert McKimson who later took over Clampett's unit. The remaining animators of the initial McKimson unit were assigned to Arthur Davis. Although inheriting most of their staff, these units have been the least known among the four, apart from having lower budgets than Jones and Freleng. In 1948, the studio moved to a larger building on the Sunset Boulevard lot. Davis' separate unit was dissolved in November 1947, and he became an animator for Freleng.

The Jones, Freleng, and McKimson units became noted by their respective styles, mostly influenced by their budgets: Jones' cartoons (who was assigned the largest budgets) featured a more visual and sophisticated style, Freleng (having budgets noticeably smaller than Jones) made extensive use of slapstick, and McKimson (who with Davis had much lower budgets) often relied more on jokes and dialogue in general.

Among the Warner Bros. cartoon stars who were created after Schlesinger's departure include Pepé Le Pew (1945, Odor-able Kitty by Jones), Sylvester (1945, Life with Feathers by Freleng), Yosemite Sam (1945, Hare Trigger by Freleng), Foghorn Leghorn (1946, Walky Talky Hawky by McKimson), Marvin the Martian (1948, Haredevil Hare by Jones),  Wile E. Coyote and the Road Runner (1949, Fast and Furry-ous by Jones), Granny (1950, Canary Row by Freleng), Speedy Gonzales (1953, Cat-Tails for Two by McKimson) and The Tasmanian Devil (1954, Devil May Hare by McKimson). In later years, even more minor Looney Tunes characters such as Freleng's Rocky and Mugsy, Jones's Gossamer and Michigan J. Frog have become significantly popular.

After the verdict of the United States v. Paramount Pictures, Inc. anti-trust case in 1948 ended the practice of "block booking", Warner Bros. could no longer force theaters into buying their features and shorts together as packages; shorts had to be sold separately. Theater owners were only willing to pay so much for cartoon shorts, and as a result, by the late-1950s the budgets at Warner Bros. Cartoons became tighter. Selzer forced a stringent five-week production schedule on each cartoon (at least one director, Chuck Jones, cheated the system by spending more time on special cartoons such as What's Opera, Doc?, less time on simpler productions such as Road Runner entries, and had his crew forge their time cards). With less money for full animation, the Warner Bros. story men — Michael Maltese, Tedd Pierce, and Warren Foster — began to focus more of their cartoons on dialogue. While story artists were assigned to directors at random during the 1930s and 1940s, by the 1950s each story man worked almost exclusively with one director: Maltese with Jones, Foster with Freleng, and Pierce with McKimson.

With the advent of the 3-D film craze in 1953, Warner Bros. shut its cartoon studio down in June of that year, fearing that 3-D cartoon production would be too expensive (only one Warner Bros. cartoon was ever produced in 3-D, Jones' Lumber Jack-Rabbit starring Bugs Bunny). The creative staff dispersed (Jones, for example, went to work at Disney on Sleeping Beauty, Maltese went to Walter Lantz Productions, and Freleng went into commercial work). Warner Bros. Cartoons re-opened five months after its close, following the end of the 3-D craze. In 1955, the staff moved into a brand new facility on the main Warner Bros. lot in Burbank. KTLA television took over the old studio location on Van Ness; the old Warner Sunset Studios is today called Sunset Bronson Studios.

Also on February 19, 1955, Warner Bros. sold its library of black and white Looney Tunes to Guild Films. The package consisted of 191 cartoons which began showing on television that year.

By 1958, Selzer had retired, and veteran Warner Cartoons production manager John Burton took his place. Warner Bros. also lost its trio of staff storymen at this time. Foster and Maltese found work at Hanna-Barbera Productions, while Pierce worked on a freelance basis with writing partner Bill Danch. John Dunn and Dave Detiege, both former Disney men, were hired to replace them.

During Burton's tenure, Warner Bros. Cartoons branched out into television. In the fall of 1960, ABC TV premiered The Bugs Bunny Show, which was a package program featuring three theatrical Warner Bros. cartoons, with newly produced wraparounds to introduce each short. The program remained on the air under various names and on all three major networks for four decades from 1960 to 2000. All versions of The Bugs Bunny Show featured Warner Bros. cartoons released after July 31, 1948, as all of the Technicolor cartoons released before that date were sold to Associated Artists Productions on June 11, 1956.

David H. DePatie became the last executive in charge of the original Warner Bros. Cartoons studio in 1961. The same year, Chuck Jones moonlighted to write the script for a UPA-produced feature titled Gay Purr-ee. When that film was picked up by Warner Bros. for distribution in 1962, the studio learned that Jones had violated his exclusive contract with Warners and he was terminated in July. Most of Jones' former unit subsequently re-joined him at Sib Tower 12 Productions to work on a new series of Tom and Jerry cartoons for MGM.

In late 1962, at the height of television popularity and decline in moviegoing, DePatie was sent to a board meeting in New York, and he was informed that the cartoon studio was going to be shut down. DePatie completed the task by 1963. Although Chuck Jones was left in mid-1963, he helped DePatie's task by directing four more cartoons with his former unit. The cartoons were Hare-Breadth Hurry, Mad as a Mars Hare, Transylvania 6-5000 and To Beep or Not to Beep. The final project at the studio was making the animated sequences, directed by McKimson, for the 1964 Warner Bros. feature The Incredible Mr. Limpet. With the studio closed, Hal Seeger Productions in New York had to be contracted to produce the opening and closing credits for The Porky Pig Show, which debuted on ABC on September 20, 1964. This marked one of the first times that the Looney Tunes characters were animated outside of the Los Angeles area.

1964–1967: DePatie–Freleng Enterprises and Format Productions 
David H. DePatie and Friz Freleng started DePatie–Freleng Enterprises in 1963, and leased the old Warner Bros. Cartoons studio as their headquarters. In 1964, Warners contracted DePatie–Freleng to produce more Looney Tunes and Merrie Melodies, an arrangement that lasted until 1967. The vast majority of these paired off Daffy Duck against Speedy Gonzales, and after a few initial cartoons directed by Freleng, Robert McKimson was hired to direct most of the remaining DePatie–Freleng Looney Tunes.

In addition to DePatie–Freleng's cartoons, a series of new shorts featuring The Road Runner and Wile E. Coyote was commissioned from an independent animation studio, Herbert Klynn's Format Productions. Veteran Warner animator Rudy Larriva, who had worked for years under Road Runner creator Chuck Jones, assumed directorial duties for these films, but even with the Jones connection, Larriva's Road Runner shorts are considered to be mediocre by critics. McKimson also directed an additional two Road Runner shorts with the main DePatie–Freleng team, which are more highly regarded than Larriva's efforts.

After three years of outsourced cartoons, Warner Bros. decided to bring production back in-house. DePatie–Freleng had their contract terminated (they subsequently moved to new studios in the San Fernando Valley), and Format was commissioned to produce three "buffer" cartoons with Daffy and Speedy (again, directed by Rudy Larriva) to fill the gap until Warner Bros.'s own studio was up and running again.

1967–1969: Warner Bros.-Seven Arts Animation 

The new cartoon studio was to be founded and headed by studio executive William L. Hendricks, and after an unsuccessful attempt at luring Bob Clampett out of retirement, former Walter Lantz Productions and Hanna-Barbera animator Alex Lovy was appointed director at the new studio. He brought his longtime collaborator, Laverne Harding to be the new studio's chief animator, and brought in Disney animator Volus Jones and Ed Solomon who also started at Disney as an assistant, which contributed to make cartoons from this era of the studio stylistically quite different from the studio's "Golden Age". Lovy also brought in animator Ted Bonnicksen and layout artist Bob Givens, both veterans of the original studio. Shortly after the studio opened, Warner Bros. was bought out by Seven Arts Associates, and the studio renamed Warner Bros.-Seven Arts.

Initially, Lovy's new team produced more Daffy and Speedy cartoons, but soon moved to create new characters such as Cool Cat and Merlin the Magic Mouse, and even occasional experimental works such as Norman Normal (1968), the only cartoon not to be in either series. Lovy's cartoons were not well received, and many enthusiasts regard them (particularly his Daffy and Speedy efforts) as the worst cartoons ever produced by the studio.

After a year, Alex Lovy left and returned to Hanna-Barbera, and Robert McKimson was brought back to the studio. He focused on using the characters that Lovy had created (and two of his own creation: Bunny and Claude). The studio's classic characters appeared only in advertisements (as for Plymouth Road Runner) and cartoon show bumpers. McKimson's films of the era have more adult-oriented humor than Lovy's. However, on October 10, 1969, Warner Bros. ceased production on all its short subjects and shut the studio down for good when Warner Bros.-Seven Arts was acquired by Kinney National Company. The back catalog of Looney Tunes and Merrie Melodies shorts would remain a popular broadcast and syndication package for Warner Bros. Television well into the 2000s, by which time it had reacquired the rights to the pre-August 1948 shorts it sold to Associated Aritsts Productions (known as a.a.p.) on June 11, 1956.

Warner Bros. Cartoons staff, 1933–1969

Studio heads 
 Leon Schlesinger (1933–1944)
 Eddie Selzer (1944–1958)
 John Burton (1958–1961)
 David H. DePatie (1961–1963)
 William L. Hendricks (1967–1969)

Directors 

 Tex Avery (1935–1942) (credited as Fred Avery)
 Ted Bonnicksen (1963)
 Bernard B. Brown (1934)
 Gerry Chiniquy (1964)
 Bob Clampett (1937–1946) (credited as Robert Clampett)
 Cal Dalton (1938–1940)
 Arthur Davis (1946–1949, 1962)
 Earl Duvall (1933–1934)
 Friz Freleng (1934–1938, 1940–1964) (credited (until late 1936) as Isadore Freleng and (until late 1955) as I. Freleng)
 Ben Hardaway (1934–1935, 1938–1940)
 Ken Harris (1959)
 Rudy Larriva (1965-1967)
 Cal Howard (1938)
 Ub Iwerks (1937)
 Chuck Jones (1938–1964) (credited (until late 1940) as Charles Jones and (until late 1955) as Charles M. Jones)
 Jack King (1934–1936)
 Abe Levitow (1959–1962)
 Alex Lovy (1967–1968)
 Norman McCabe (1940–1943)
 Robert McKimson (1946–1969)
 Phil Monroe (1963–1964)
 Maurice Noble (1961–1964)
 Tom Palmer (1933)
 Hawley Pratt (1946, 1961–1964)
 Frank Tashlin (1936–1938, 1943–1946)
 Richard Thompson (1963)
 Bill Tytla (1964)

Storyboard artists/writers 

 Howard Baldwin
 Nick Bennion
 David Detiege
 John Dunn
 Warren Foster
 Friz Freleng
 Ben Hardaway
 George Hill
 Cal Howard
 Rich Hogan
 Chuck Jones
 Bob Clampett
 Lew Landsman
 Lou Lilly
 Sid Marcus
 Michael Maltese
 George Manuell
 Robert McKimson
 Melvin "Tubby" Millar
 Jack Miller
 Dave Monahan
 Fred Neiman
 Tedd Pierce
 Bill Scott
 Dr. Seuss
 Lloyd Turner

Layout/Background artists/designers 

 Pete Alvarado
 Philip DeGuard
 Gene Fleury
 Nic Gibson
 Robert Givens
 Robert Gribbroek
 Alex Ignatiev
 John Didrik Johnsen
 Willie Ito
 Paul Julian
 Earl Klein
 John McGrew
 Tom McKimson
 Maurice Noble
 Ernie Nordli
 Tom O'Loughlin
 Hawley Pratt
 David Rose
 Micheal Sasanoff
 Don Smith
 William Butler
 Richard H. Thomas
 Cornett Wood
 Irv Wyner

Animators 

 Fred Abranz
 Art Babbitt
 Warren Batchelder
 Robert Bentley
 Richard Bickenbach
 Norm Blackburn
 Ted Bonnicksen
 Jack Bradbury
 Bob Bransford
 Pete Burness
 George Cannata
 Robert "Bobe" Cannon
 John Carey
 Jack Carr
 Ken Champin
 Gerry Chiniquy
 Robert Clampett
 Ben Clopton
 Herman Cohen
 Shamus Culhane
 Cal Dalton
 Keith Darling
 Basil Davidovich
 Arthur Davis
 Jim Davis
 Phil DeLara
 Jaime Diaz
 Joe D'Igalo
 Russ Dyson
 Robert Edmunds
 I. Ellis
 Paul Fennell
 John Freeman
 Ace "A.C." Gamer (Effects Animator)
 John Gibbs
 George Grandpre
 Manny Gould
 Lee Halpern
 Rollin Hamilton
 Laverne Harding
 Ken Harris
 Emery Hawkins
 Alex Ignatiev
 Chuck Jones
 Fred Jones
 Volus Jones
 Jack King
 Anatolle Kirsanoff
 Rudy Larriva
 Art Leonardi
 Abe Levitow
 Harry Love (Effects Animator)
 Bob Matz
 Max Maxwell
 Norman McCabe
 John McGrew
 Charles McKimson
 Robert McKimson
 Thomas McKimson
 Bill Melendez
 Phil Monroe
 Al Pabian 
 Jim Pabian
 Ray Patin
 Manuel Perez
 Tom Ray
 Bob Richardson
 Vive Risto
 Phil Roman
 Virgil Ross
 Rod Scribner
 Larry Silverman
 Hank Smith
 Paul Smith
 Ed Solomon
 Irven Spence
 Robert Stokes
 Cecil Surry
 Sid Sutherland
 Bob Taylor
 Richard Thompson
 Riley Thomson
 Frank Tipper
 Gil Turner
 Lloyd Vaughan
 Sandy Walker
 Elmer Wait
 Ben Washam
 Volney White
 Bob Wickersham
 Don Williams

Voices 

 Mel Blanc
 Tex Avery
 Dave Barry
 Dick Beals
 Bea Benaderet
 Julie Bennett
 Sara Berner
 Billy Bletcher
 Lucille Bliss
 Billy Booth
 Robert C. Bruce
 Arthur Q. Bryan
 Daws Butler
 Pinto Colvig
 Joe Dougherty
 June Foray
 Stan Freberg
 Joan Gerber
 Frank Graham
 Bernice Hansen
 Margaret Hill-Talbot
 Trust Howard
 Paul Julian
 Abe Lyman
 Tedd Pierce
 Alan Reed
 Marian Richman
 Kent Rogers
 Hal Smith
 John T. Smith
 Larry Storch
 Bill Thompson
 Danny Webb
 Nancy Wible

Music 
Musical Directors
 Bernard B. Brown (1933–1936)
 Norman Spencer (1933–1936)
 Carl W. Stalling (1936–1958) (credited (until late 1946) as Carl W. Stalling)
  Eugene Poddany (1951)
 Milt Franklyn (1954–1962)
 John Seely (1958)
 William Lava (1962–1969) (credited (until 1967) as Bill Lava)
 Walter Greene (1966–1967)
 Frank Perkins (1967)

Orchestrations
 Milt Franklyn (1936–1962)

Film (Sound effects) editors 
 Treg Brown
 Irvin Jay
 Lee Gunther
 Hal Geer

Filmography

See also 
 Harman and Ising
 The Golden Age of American animation
 Looney Tunes
 Merrie Melodies
 Warner Bros. Animation
 List of animation studios owned by Warner Bros. Discovery

Notes

References

External links 
 Warner Bros. official site
 Warner Bros. Animation Chronology: 1930 to the Present

 
American animation studios
Entertainment companies based in California
Film studios in Southern California
Companies based in Los Angeles
Mass media companies established in 1933
Mass media companies disestablished in 1969
1933 establishments in California
1969 disestablishments in California
Defunct companies based in Greater Los Angeles
Articles containing video clips
American companies established in 1933
American companies disestablished in 1969
Defunct American film studios
Companies based in California
Warner Bros.
1944 mergers and acquisitions